The Nablus Football Stadium has a capacity of 15,000. The stadium is home to the city's football club al-Ittihad, which is in the main league in Palestine. The club participated in the Middle East Mediterranean Scholar Athlete Games in 2000.
This stadium, which was constructed in 1950, is the 1st stadium in Palestine, in 2009 it was rebuilt and expanded to meet the FIFA standards, its area is 105x68 with field area of 111x74.
The development of the stadium has made its capacity to be 15,000 and the whole project cost was 1.5 M $.

References

Buildings and structures in Nablus
Football venues in the State of Palestine
Sport in the West Bank
Sports venues completed in 1950
1950 establishments in Asia